Monoceratuncus is a genus of moths belonging to the family Tortricidae.

Species
Monoceratuncus autolytus (Razowski, 1986)
Monoceratuncus conviva (Razowski, 1990)
Monoceratuncus cristatus (Razowski & Becker, 1986)
Monoceratuncus cryphalus Razowski, 1993
Monoceratuncus eriodens (Razowski, 1986)
Monoceratuncus lugens (Razowski & Becker, 1986)
Monoceratuncus peltatus Razowski & Becker, 1993
Monoceratuncus tantulus (Razowski & Becker, 1986)

See also
List of Tortricidae genera

References

 , 1986: New and little known Neotropical Cochylidii (Lepidoptera, Tortricidae). Acta Zoologica Cracoviensia 29: 373–396.
 , 1992 (1990): Descriptions of some Neotropical Euliini and Archipini (Lepidoptera, Tortricidae). Miscellanea Zoologicae 14: 105–114.
 , 2011: Diagnoses and remarks on genera of Tortricidae, 2: Cochylini (Lepidoptera: Tortricidae). Shilap Revista de Lepidopterologia 39 (156): 397–414.
 , 1986: Cochylidii (Lepidoptera: Tortricidae) collected in Central America and Mexico. Acta Zoologica Cracoviensia 29: 441–500.

External links
tortricidae.com

Cochylini
Tortricidae genera